Ion Ansotegi Gorostola (born 13 July 1982) is a Spanish former footballer who played as a central defender.

He spent most of his professional career with Real Sociedad after signing with the club at the age of 21, going on to appear in 227 official matches during 11 seasons. 124 of those appearances came in La Liga (six goals scored).

Football career
Ansotegi was born in Berriatua, Basque Country. After starting his professional career with SD Eibar (with a loan to Barakaldo CF included), he moved to local giants Real Sociedad. He made his La Liga debut on 22 January 2006 in a 3–3 home draw against Athletic Bilbao for the Basque derby, and played 33 games in his first two top flight seasons combined.

Ansotegi only missed two matches in 2009–10, being booked just six times in his 40 complete appearances – and adding four goals – as Real Sociedad returned to division one after a three-year absence. He featured in 32 contests (all starts) in the following campaign as the team retained their league status, but lost his importance in the squad following the January 2011 signing of Norwegian Vadim Demidov and the emergence of youth product Iñigo Martínez.

On 1 June 2015, aged nearly 33, Ansotegi renewed his contract with Real Sociedad until 2016. On 1 February of the following year, after only two Copa del Rey appearances during the first part of the season, he cut ties with the Txuriurdin and moved back to his first club Eibar after agreeing to an initial six-month deal.

On 30 June 2016, Ansotegui signed a one-year contract with RCD Mallorca in Segunda División. Roughly 12 months later, after suffering relegation, he announced his retirement and immediate return to Real Sociedad as youth system coordinator.

References

External links

1982 births
Living people
People from Lea-Artibai
Spanish footballers
Footballers from the Basque Country (autonomous community)
Association football defenders
La Liga players
Segunda División players
Segunda División B players
SD Eibar footballers
Barakaldo CF footballers
Real Sociedad B footballers
Real Sociedad footballers
RCD Mallorca players
Basque Country international footballers
Real Sociedad non-playing staff
Association football coaches
Sportspeople from Biscay